"Let's Lock the Door (And Throw Away the Key)" is a song written by Roy Alfred and Wes Farrell and was released by Jay and the Americans in 1964. The song went to No. 11 on the Billboard Hot 100 in 1965 and was on the charts for 10 weeks.

Charts

References

1965 singles
Songs written by Wes Farrell
Jay and the Americans songs
RPM Top Singles number-one singles
1965 songs
United Artists Records singles
Song recordings produced by Artie Ripp
Songs with lyrics by Roy Alfred